Manuel Díez-Alegría Gutiérrez (25 July 1906 – 3 February 1987) was a Spanish military officer who served as Chief of the Defence High Command  between 1970 and 1974, i.e., chief of staff of the Spanish Armed Forces during the Francoist dictatorship.

Non-military positions
Díez-Alegría served as Ambassador of Spain to Egypt between 1976 and 1978, during the Spanish transition to democracy.

Additionally, he was a member of the Royal Academy of Moral and Political Sciences from 1968, the Royal Spanish Academy from 1980, and the Cortes Españolas (1970–1977).

Awards
 Grand Cross of the Royal and Military Order of Saint Hermenegild (1961)
 Grand Cross (with White Decoration) of Military Merit (1964)
 Grand Cross (with White Decoration) of Naval Merit (1968)
 Grand Cross of the Imperial Order of the Yoke and Arrows (1969)
 Grand Cross of the Order of Isabella the Catholic (1970)
 Grand Cross of the Civil Order of Alfonso X, the Wise (1971)
 Grand Cross of the Order of Civil Merit (1977)

References

1906 births
1987 deaths
People from Asturias
People from Llanes
20th-century Spanish military personnel
Spanish lieutenant generals
Ambassadors of Spain to Egypt
Members of the Royal Spanish Academy
Members of the Cortes Españolas
Spanish military personnel of the Spanish Civil War (National faction)
Colegio de la Inmaculada (Gijón) alumni
Grand Crosses of the Royal and Military Order of San Hermenegild
Knights Grand Cross of the Order of Isabella the Catholic
Recipients of the Civil Order of Alfonso X, the Wise
Grand Crosses of Military Merit
Grand Crosses of Naval Merit
Grand Cross of the Order of Civil Merit